Kyle Wood may refer to:

 Kyle Wood (rugby league) (born 1989), rugby league footballer
 Kyle Wood (ice hockey) (born 1996), Canadian ice hockey defenceman